Nectar or Nectar Group is a Serbian beverage company. It is headquartered in Bačka Palanka, Serbia.

History
The company was founded on 19 January 1999, as a Radun family company.

On 25 July 2011, Nectar bought 93,73 shares of the Slovenian beverage company Fructal for 50 million euros. Later in 2011, on October 31, Nectar bought Vladičin Han-based company Delišes for 300,000 euros.

References

External links
 

Companies based in Bačka Palanka
Food and drink companies established in 1998
D.o.o. companies in Serbia
Drink companies of Serbia
Serbian brands
Serbian companies established in 1998